Adela Rita Cortese (born 5 August 1949) is an Argentine theatre, film, and television actress and singer. She is considered one of the best actresses of Argentina.

Life and career
Cortese was born in Buenos Aires on 5 August 1949. She is of Spanish and Italian descent. In 1967, she started studying Philosophy and Letters, but dropped out a year later. She began studying acting at 24 years old in 1973 with professor Néstor Raimondi, and later with Carlos Gandolfo, two of the "four great acting teachers" of the time. She was also a student of theatre director Roberto Villanueva, who directed her in multiple plays.

Her first professional role was in the play Marathón (1980), written by Ricardo Monti and directed by Jaime Kogan. In the 1980s, Cortese was part of the Argentine Open Theatre, an independent theatre movement in resistance of the 1976–83 civil–military dictatorship in Argentina.

Typically a supporting actress, she had her first lead role in a feature film in Inheritance, released in Argentina in 2002.

Personal life
Cortese resides in the Monserrat neighbourhood in Buenos Aires.

Credits

Film
 Asesinato en el Senado de la Nación (1984)
 La República perdida II (1986)
 A Wall of Silence (1993)
 Ashes of Paradise (1997)
 Momentos robados (1997)
 El sueño de los héroes (1997)
 Cohen vs. Rosi (1998)
 La nube (1998)
 Alma mía (1999)
 Apariencias (2000)
 Inheritance (2001)
 ¿Y dónde está el bebé? (2002)
 Samy y yo (2002)
 ¿Sabés nadar? (2002)
 Monobloc (2005)
 Familia Lugones (2007)
 Horizontal/vertical (2009)
 Brother and Sister (2010)
 Los Marziano (2010)
 Widows (2011)
 Verdades verdaderas (2011)
 Wild Tales (2014)
 Heroic Losers (2019)
 Bruja (2019)
 Las siamesas (2020)
 La sombra del gato (2021)
 Un crimen argentino (2022)
 The Substitute (2022)

Television
 Corazones de fuego (1992)
 Alta comedia (1993–1994)
 Los especiales de Doria (1996)
 R.R.D.T. (1997)
 Señoras y señores (1997)
 Laura y Zoe (1998)
 Verano del '98 (1999–2000)
 El sodero de mi vida (2001–2002)
 Mil millones (2002)
 Costumbres argentinas (2003)
 Malandras (2003)
 Sol negro (2003)
 Los secretos de papá (2004)
 Sin código (2005)
 Montecristo (2006)
 Lalola (2007)
 Reparaciones (2007)
 Mujeres asesinas 4 (2008)
 Scusate il disturbo (2009)
 Mitos, crónicas del amor descartable (2009)
 Botineras (2010)
 Tiempo para pensar (2011)
 Volver a nacer (2012)
 Graduados (2012)
 El hombre de tu vida (2012)
 La viuda de Rafael (2012)
 Esa mujer (2013)
 Historias de corazón (2013)
 Doce casas, Historia de mujeres devotas (2013)
 Escuela nocturna (2014)
 Esperanza mía (2015)
 El jardín de bronce (2017)
 Maradona: Blessed Dream (2021)

Accolades

Notes

References

External links

 
 

Living people
1949 births
Argentine film actresses
Argentine stage actresses
Argentine television actresses
Actresses from Buenos Aires